Upper Montclair is a census-designated place (CDP), unincorporated community and neighborhood within Montclair in Essex County, New Jersey, United States. As of the 2010 United States Census, the population for the CDP was 11,565. The area is served as United States Postal Service ZIP code 07043. It is often misperceived, even by Montclair residents, to be a separate municipality from Montclair, perhaps aided by this postal designation.

History
The area now known as Upper Montclair was first developed in the early 18th century as a rural community known as Speertown, named for John Speer, an early Dutch settler. The area remained a rural hamlet for much of that century. The modern township of Montclair, including Upper Montclair, was incorporated in 1868 from part of Bloomfield Township.  In the early 21st century, the area became known as Uptown Montclair.

Geography

According to the United States Census Bureau, the CDP had a total area of 2.536 square miles (6.569 km2), including 2.535 square miles (6.567 km2) of land and 0.001 square miles (0.002 km2) of water (0.04%).

Upper Montclair is north of Watchung Avenue, covering 40.2% of Montclair township's area.

Demographics

Education
  Upper Montclair is in the township of Montclair and is served by the Montclair Public Schools. More than a quarter of the district's schools are found in Upper Montclair. These include Bradford Elementary and Northeast Elementary, which are two of seven elementary schools in Montclair, and Mt. Hebron Middle School, renamed Buzz Aldrin Middle School in September 2016 in honor of the astronaut, who grew up in Montclair, which is one of three Montclair middle schools. Part of Montclair State University's campus is in Upper Montclair.

Upper Montclair is also home to several private schools. They include Lacordaire Academy, Lacordaire Academy Elementary Division and St. Cassian School.

Transportation
Upper Montclair is well connected to the rest of New Jersey and New York City on account of its transportation infrastructure. Public transportation options in Upper Montclair are buses and trains, both provided by New Jersey Transit, although commuter bus service to Manhattan is provided by DeCamp Bus Lines.

Rail
 New Jersey Transit's Montclair-Boonton Line Runs through the neighborhood of Upper Montclair. In total in Upper Montclair there are a total of three train stations of the overall Montclair total of seven.  This is because the stations in Montclair are very close together, sometimes under a mile apart. New Jersey Transit train stations are Upper Montclair, Mountain Avenue, and Montclair Heights. From 1889 to 1928, Valley Road, a major road, had an electric trolley line.

Bus

The area is also on NJ Transit's bus route 28, which goes from Montclair State University or Willowbrook Mall along Valley Road through Montclair, Glen Ridge and Bloomfield, to Downtown Newark.  This bus route goes along Valley road for the great majority of its path in Upper Montclair, in some places on the route of Decamp's  Number 66.  Also, two DeCamp Bus Lines routes take commuters to the Port Authority Bus Terminal in New York. Some Number 33 buses go along Grove Street, on the Eastern side of the neighborhood, while number 66 goes on Valley Road, in the West, then the central Park Street.

Road
Upper Montclair has road connections to the rest of Montclair, Cedar Grove, Little Falls, Clifton, and Bloomfield.  Just north of the neighborhood's border are U.S. Route 46 and New Jersey Route 3.

Commerce
The commercial zone at the center of Upper Montclair, Upper Montclair Business District is home to several restaurants and shops. Unlike many of Montclair's other commercial zones, it has outlets of several major chain stores. In 2009–2010, several new national and local merchants opened in the area. Montclair Station Restaurant & Bar was opened in the historic Upper Montclair train station.  Upper Montclair also has both a park, Anderson Park, and a railway station, Upper Montclair, nearby.  There is a post office here.

Parks
Upper Montclair is home to many parks and nature reserves. Within Upper Montclair there are  Anderson Park,  Yantacaw Brook Park,  the Bonsal Nature Reserve,  Mountainside Park,  the Presby Memorial Iris Gardens,  and parts of Mills Reservation and Brookdale Park. In addition, Upper Montclair has the Mountainside Public Pool, which is the largest of the three public pools in Montclair.

Upper Montclair also has Immaculate Conception Cemetery and Mount Hebron Cemetery.

Notable people

People who were born in, residents of, or otherwise closely associated with Upper Montclair include:

 Buzz Aldrin (born 1930), astronaut who was the second man to walk on the Moon.
 Yael Averbuch (born 1986), soccer player.
 Raymond A. Brown (1915–2009), attorney whose clients included Black Liberation Army member Assata Shakur, boxer Rubin "Hurricane" Carter and "Dr. X" physician Mario Jascalevich.
 Margaret Colin (born 1958), actress.
 Justin Deas (born 1948), actor.
 John Langley Howard (1902–1999), muralist, printmaker and illustrator, known for his social realism.
 Howard Krongard, head of the Office of the Inspector General of the Department of State.
 Rosemary Rice (1925–2012), actress best known for her role as Katrin on CBS-TV series Mama.
 Dr. Leo Sternbach (1908–2005), chemist, invented precursor to Valium.
 Joe Walsh (born 1947), singer, songwriter, composer, multi-instrumentalist and record producer.
 Ingrid Wells (born 1989), soccer player.

Gallery

References

 
Census-designated places in Essex County, New Jersey
Montclair, New Jersey